Guam Highway 2 is one of the primary automobile routes in the United States territory of Guam.

Route description
The route runs in a south to north direction, from the Magellan Monument in the southern community of Umatac in a general northward direction to the community of Santa Rita, where it meets Highway 2A (which connects to Guam Highway 1 Marine Corps Drive) and Gate 2 of Naval Base Guam.

Major intersections

Suffixed route

Guam Highway 2A (GH-2A) connects GH-2 to GH-1 in Santa Rita, junctioning with GH-5 along the way.

References

002